Nāyla al-Khāja (Arabic: نايلة الخاجة‎, born 7 March 1978) is the first female film writer, director and producer in the United Arab Emirates . Al-Khaja's films have screened at more than 42 film festivals worldwide.

In 2006, al-Khaja wrote and directed her first short film, Arabana, which premiered at DIFF 2007, and she was awarded Best Emirate Filmmaker at the event. Since her debut, she has written and directed five more short films: Once (2009), Malal (2010) and The Neighbor (2013), Animal (2016), The Shadow (2019). In October 2016, al-Khaja shot a pilot for her first feature film, Animal, and it was presented at DIFF 2016. The film also received the Jury’s Special Prize for Best Short Fiction at the Italian Movie Award in Pompeii, Italy, in September 2017. Nayla also won a seat at the prestigious Producers Network at the Cannes Film Festival 2018.

In March 2021, the BBC purchased the rights to broadcast Animal and The Shadow. In April 2021, it was announced in global media outlets, that a series from a concept al-Khaja devised will become an anthology. The first season, The Alexandria Killings, will have Oscar-winning Director Terry George at the helm. al-Khaja will be credited as Executive Producer for the series. She is also currently working on a family adventure film, Magic Carpet, as well as her own debut feature film, Three, both of which are slated for release in 2022.

al-Khaja is the CEO of Nayla Al Khaja Films, a Dubai-based company previously named D-Seven Motion Pictures, and is also founder of The Scene Club, Dubai’s first film club, launched in 2007.

Beginnings 
Holder of a degree in Mass Communication from Dubai Women's College, she graduated in 2005 with a Bachelor in Image Studies and Filmmaking from Ryerson University (Canada). When she returned to Dubai, she directed and produced the documentary Unveiling Dubai. Supported by Sheikh Nahyan bin Mubarak Al Nahyan, United Arab Emirates’s Minister of Higher Education, the film premiered at the 2006 Dubai International Film Festival (DIFF). Al Nahyan then officially announced al-Khaja as the first woman filmmaker in the United Arab Emirates.

Filmmaker 
al-Khaja first 8mm work was a film called Sweet Sixteen (1996). It was entirely shot in the deserts of Mirdif and was immediately followed by The Will (released in 2003), in collaboration with Tim Smythe, from the Dubai production company Film works. She experimented with the documentary style with 3adi.com (1998), followed by two narratives, Cockroach (2004) and The Loss (2005). In 2006, Al Khaja wrote and directed her first commissioned short film, Arabana about child abuse (with the support of UNICEF), which premiered at DIFF 2007. That year, she was also awarded the title of Best Emirati Filmmaker. Since then, she has written and directed three more short films: Once (2009), Malal (2010) and The Neighbor (2013). Malal received the Muhr Emirati Award at DIFF 2010, and The Neighbor was awarded Best Emirate Film at the 2014 Abu Dhabi Film Festival. In October 2016, she shot the pilot of her first feature film, Animal, nominated for the Muhr Emirati Awards at DIFF 2016. This short film received the Jury’s Special Prize for Best Short Fiction at the Italian Movie Award in Pompeii, Italy, in September 2017. Animal also received the Juryz Award in the "Narrative Film" category at the Ras Al Khaimah Fine Arts Festival (United Arab Emirates) in February 2018. Since 2017, Al Khaja has been developing her first feature film, Animal, and was awarded an accreditation to present the project at the Producers Network during the Cannes Film Festival (France) in May 2018.

Entrepreneur 
Nayla al-Khaja Films (previously D-Seven Motion Pictures)

Since its inception in 2005, Nayla al-Khaja's production house, D-Seven Motion Pictures, has focused on the local production of various films, fully developed and produced ‘in-house’, bringing a wealth of experience and cultural knowledge to national and international projects. Over the years, she has produced in numerous promotional films and TV commercials in the United Arab Emirates local and international brands.

In 2015, her company was hired by Discovery Studios to produce and prepare a reality show highlighting the best of Dubai, while empowering women. E!, the largest American reality-show network, bought the rights for the show and D-Seven Motion Pictures line-produced its pilot, the first of its kind to be entirely shot in Dubai. The same year, the Dubai Film and TV Commission asked al-Khaja’s company to shoot a behind-the-scenes film for Star Trek Beyond to highlight Dubai as a regional filming hub.

In 2017 D-Seven Motion Pictures re-branded to Nayla Al Khaja Films.

As well as filmmaking, the studio has produced commercial films for local and international brands including Mercedes, BMW, Vogue, Nike, Nivea, Gucci, Samsung, Canon, LG, Maggi, and Neutrogena.

The Scene Club

al-Khaja established The Scene Club, the United Arab Emirates' first film club, in 2007. The Scene Club (22,000 registered members) has been continuously presenting a wide selection of independent movies and award-winning films in their original format to United Arab Emirates audiences.

Cultural Consultant

Al-Khaja is considered a reference in the Middle East being from the United Arab Emirates. al-Khaja has worked as a cultural consultant on both film and television projects across the Gulf. She was hired by Maserati for a campaign that highlighted Ramadan in KSA and has also worked on series that celebrated Saudi achievers for Quest Arabiya.

Motivational Speaker

Fluent in Arabic and English, al-Khaja has been registered at the London Speaker Bureau for more than ten years. She is also registered at MENA Speakers and has given TED Talks. al-Khaja speaks on Arab women stereotypes, how to stand out in a male-dominated industry, the crux of gender balance, and how to combat fear and chase one’s dreams. She frequently travels abroad to speak in international keynotes about cinema, entrepreneurship, culture, youth motivation and women's empowerment in the Middle East.

Influence 
Since 2011, Nāyla al-Khāja has been a Brand Ambassador for Canon Middle East and is in constant demand as a collaborator for high-profile brands such as Porsche, Damas and Sunday Riley. Since October 2017, she has directed and appeared in her own YouTube web-series #NaylaFlogs, in which she shares her life as a filmmaker with her followers.

Personal life
A graduate of Ryerson University in Toronto, Nayla resides in Dubai and is married to a Swiss National with whom she has two children.

Filmography 

 Sweet Sixteen (1996) – Written and directed by Nayla Al Khaja, comedy short
 3adi.com (1998) – Directed by Nayla Al Khaja, documentary
 The Will (2003) – Produced by Nayla Al Khaja, directed by Sharif Junaid, documentary
 The Loss (2005) – Produced by Nayla Al Khaja with Shawn Reynolds, Shannon Paterson, Mackenzie Muldoon, drama
 Unveiling Dubai (2005) – Produced and directed by Nayla Al Khaja with Nayla Al Khaja, Nicolas Doldinger, documentary
 Arabana (2006) – Written and directed by Nayla Al Khaja with Feriyal Entezari, drama short
 Once (2009) – Written and directed by Nayla Al Khaja with Nifin G. Al Din, Bassim Sami Al Khalif, Hammad B. Al Khalif, drama short
 Malal (2010) – Written and directed by Nayla Al Khaja with Nayla Al Khaja, Hormuz Mehta, Ghassan Al Khateri, romance/drama short
 Hi (2012) – Written and directed by Nayla Al Khaja with Mona Al Assa’d, Sheree Framrose, drama short
 Three (2013) – Written and directed by Nayla Al Khaja with Aya Al Ansari, Fatima Al Shroqi, Katrina Bernardo, horror short
 The Neighbor (2013) – Written and directed by Nayla Al Khaja with Crystal Bates, short
 Animal (Pilot, 2016) – Written and directed by Nayla Al Khaja with Mohammed Ahmed, Venetia Tiarks, Donya Asi, Abhijit Baruah, pilot for feature film
 The Shadow (2019) – Written and directed by Nayla Al Khaja with Sara Al Aqeeli, Mohannad Huthail, Miran Yazi, Mona Ragab, Abdulrahman Ahmed, Abdulrazzaq Al Khaja, Rashid Mohammed, Mohammed Mahfoud, Drama Short

Film awards 

 "Best United Arab Emirates. talent" for The Shadow, Al Ain Film Festival, United Arab Emirates, 2020
 Jury Award, “Narrative Film” category, for Animal, Ras Al Khaimah Fine Arts Festival, Ras-Al-Khaimah, United Arab Emirates, 2018
 Jury Special Prize, "Best Short Fiction", for Animal, Italian Movie Award, Pompeii, Italy, 2017
 "Best Short Film" for The Neighbor, Middle East Now Festival, Florence, Italy, 2015
 "Muhr Emirate - Special Jury Award" for The Neighbor, Dubai International Film Festival, 2015
 Doha Film Institute (DFI), "Hazawi Fund for Short Film" Three, April 2013
 "Production of the Year Award", Malal, Digital Studio Award, 2011
 "1st Prize, Muhr Emirati Category" for Malal, Dubai International Film Festival, 2010
 "Best Script Award" for Malal, Gulf International Film Festival, 2010
 "1st Prize, International Young Screen Entrepreneur," British Council, UK and UAE, 2010
 "1st Prize, Emirati Short Film Script Competition", Gulf Film Festival, UAE, 2010
 "Best Female Filmmaker", Dubai International Film Festival, 2007

Accolades (summary) 

 Businesswoman of the Year - Gulf Business Awards 2020
 "Top four emirati women listed in Forbes", September 2019
 "Black Swan Award for Women Empowerment", Asia One, 2019
 "Most Admired Leaders of Asia 2018 - Process Evaluators & Research", BARC Asia & Jury Panel, 2018
 "First Emirati ever to be awarded a seat at the prestigious Producers Network at the Cannes Film Festival", for the feature script Animal, 2018
 "Entrepreneur of the Year", Gulf Business Awards, September 2017
 "100 most powerful Arabs under 40", Arabian Business Power List, 2015
 "Top Female Entrepreneur in The Middle East", August 2013
 Recognized as "500 Most Powerful Arab People", 2012
 "Top 50 Most Powerful Arab Women", 2012
 "Visionary of the Year", Arabian Business Awards, 2011
 Member of Abu Dhabi Film Commission, Melbourne International Film Festival, 2010
 Endorser for Emirates NBD Bank
 UAE Representative (Filmmaker Category), US Dept. of State, International Visitors Leadership Program, 2010
 Jury member at the Middle East International Film Festival, 2009
 Cultural guide and co-host on Paris Hilton’s “My BFF”
 "UAE Woman of the Year", Film/Photo Category, L’Officiel Magazine, 2009
 "Young Woman Entrepreneur of the Year", Middle East Businesswomen and Leaders Achievement Awards, 2007
 "Inspirational Leadership Award", Lloyds TSB Bank, 2006
 "Emirates Woman of the Year", Emirates Woman Magazine, 2005
 "Local Artist of the Year", Emirates Woman Magazine, 2005
 "The Youngest Entrepreneur", Global Businesswomen and Leaders’ Summit Awards, 2005
 Top 50 most powerful personalities in Arab Cinema  
 Top 100 most powerful Arabs under 40 by Arabian Business

References

External links
 Nayla Al Khaja’s website 
 

Emirati film producers
Emirati women film directors
Women screenwriters
People from Dubai
Living people
Emirati screenwriters
1978 births